Mara Zoe Titarsolej (born 28 August 1999) is a Dutch artistic gymnast. She competed at the 2015 World Championships, where she helped the Dutch team qualify for the 2016 Summer Olympics, marking the first time they qualified a team to the Olympics since 1976. At the 2015 Dutch National Championships, she finished second in the all-around, second on uneven bars, and fourth on floor exercise. She also placed fifth on floor at the 2016 European Championships. She competes for the LIU Sharks in NCAA gymnastics.

References

1999 births
Living people
Dutch female artistic gymnasts
20th-century Dutch women
21st-century Dutch women